Roland Gehrke (born 17 January 1954) is a retired heavyweight freestyle wrestler from East Germany. Between 1975 and 1983 he won eight medals at the world and European championships, including a world title in 1981. He placed fourth at the 1976 and 1980 Summer Olympics and 1982 World Wrestling Championships.

References

External links
 

1954 births
Living people
Olympic wrestlers of East Germany
Wrestlers at the 1976 Summer Olympics
Wrestlers at the 1980 Summer Olympics
German male sport wrestlers
People of the Stasi
World Wrestling Championships medalists
World Wrestling Champions